Cuenot or Cuénot is a French surname. Notable people with the surname include:
Bénédicte Cuenot, French combustion engineer
Gaspard Cuenot (born 1991), Swiss skier and biathlete
Lucien Cuénot (1866–1951), French biologist
Stephen Theodore Cuenot (Étienne-Théodore Cuénot Thể, 1802–1861), French Catholic missionary, bishop, and saint

French-language surnames